Job title inflation is the increasing number and size of grandiose job titles in corporations and organisations, without a corresponding increase in pay or an increased importance of the job. The phenomenon may be caused by employers who want to flatter their workers in a way that does not involve an increase in work responsibility or pay.

See also
Parkinson's Law
Credential inflation of job requirements
Grade inflation in education

References

Further reading

Corporate governance
Hierarchy
Occupations
Titles